The 1954–55 season was the 62nd season in Liverpool F.C.'s existence and their first year in the Second Division since 1905, after their relegation from the First Division the previous season.

Not only did Liverpool not make any sort of promotion challenge this season, a terrible start saw them in serious danger of relegation to the Third Division North for much of the season. A late run of form ultimately saw Liverpool safe, but their eventual finish of 11th place remains their lowest-ever Football League final position.

Goalkeepers

 Charlie Ashcroft
 Doug Rudham
 Dave Underwood

Defenders

 Keith Burkinshaw
 Don Campbell
 Laurie Hughes
 Ray Lambert
 Frank Lock
 Ronnie Moran
 Tom McNulty
 Fred Perry
 John Price
 Alex South
 Fred Tomley
 Geoff Twentyman
 Dick White

Midfielders

 Alan A'Court
 Brian Jackson
 Jimmy Payne
 Roy Saunders
 Barry Wilkinson

Forwards

 Eric Anderson
 Alan Arnell
 Louis Bimpson
 John Evans
 Billy Liddell
 Tony Rowley

Table

Results

Second Division

FA Cup

References
 LFC History.net – 1954-55 season
 Liverweb - 1954-55 Season

Liverpool F.C. seasons
Liverpool